The One You Love may refer to:

"The One You Love" (Glenn Frey song), 1982
"The One You Love" (Rufus Wainwright song), 2005
"The One You Love" (Paulina Rubio song), 2002
"The Ones You Love", a 1993 song by Rick Astley